Schausiania furfurens is a moth in the family Cossidae. It is found in South America.

References

Cossidae